Moselem is an unincorporated community in Richmond Township in Berks County, Pennsylvania, United States. Moselem is located along Pennsylvania Route 662, east of Maiden Creek.

History
A post office called Moselem was established in 1846, and remained in operation until 1907. Moselem is a name derived from a Native American language purported to mean "trout stream".

References

Unincorporated communities in Berks County, Pennsylvania
Unincorporated communities in Pennsylvania